Erela Golan (born 1945) is a former Israeli politician who served as a member of the Knesset for Shinui and the Secular Faction between 2003 and 2006.

Biography
Born in Petah Tikva, Golan gained a BA in theatre and an MA in biology, specialising in neurophysiology. She also studied preservation of construction heritage at Tel Aviv University, and later worked as an architect.

In 1980 she joined Shinui. For the 2003 elections she was placed 16th on the party's list. Although the party won only 15 seats, as the next candidate on the list, Golan entered the Knesset on 16 December 2004 as a replacement for Yehudit Naot who died while in office. During her first term, she was a member of the Internal Affairs and Environment Committee, the Education, Culture, and Sports Committee, the Committee on the Status of Women, the Committee on Drug Abuse and the Science and Technology Committee.

Along with most of the party's MKs, she defected to the Secular Faction (which later became Hetz) shortly before the 2006 elections following disagreements over the results of Shinui's primary results. She was placed seventh on the Hetz list for the elections, but lost her seat when the party failed to cross the electoral threshold.

She later joined Meli Polishook-Bloch's Derekh Aheret movement, of which she was the deputy leader, before leaving to join Efraim Sneh's Yisrael Hazaka party in early 2008.

References

External links
 

1945 births
People from Petah Tikva
Israeli architects
Members of the 16th Knesset (2003–2006)
Living people
Women members of the Knesset
Hetz (political party) politicians
Shinui politicians
Yisrael Hazaka politicians
Tel Aviv University alumni
Academic staff of the Hebrew University of Jerusalem
21st-century Israeli women politicians